West Florence High School is a public secondary school serving grades 9 through 12 in Florence, South Carolina, United States. The school is located on the city's west side, near the intersection of Interstates 20 and 95.

History 

In 2020, Governor Henry McMaster delivered the commencement address at the school's graduation ceremony amid the COVID-19 pandemic. Following his address, he sang Mull of Kintyre while playing his guitar.

Band 

On March 3, 2010, Lord Mayor of Westminster Duncan Sandys presented a formal invitation to West Florence High School Director of Bands Steve Rummage, requesting that the West Florence Marching Knights participate and perform in the city of London's 2012 New Year's Day Parade.  This parade was designated as the first official event of the 2012 Olympics, hosted in London. Because of this honor, the South Carolina State Legislature introduced and adopted Senate Resolution 712, to honor and congratulate the West Florence Knights Marching Band.

Notable alumni 

 Akeem Bostick – Major League Baseball (MLB) pitcher
 Brandon Bostick – National Football League (NFL) tight end
 Malliciah Goodman – NFL defensive end
 Mark L. Walberg – television host

References 

Public high schools in South Carolina
Schools in Florence County, South Carolina
1970 establishments in South Carolina
Educational institutions established in 1970